S500 may refer to :

 S-500 missile system, a Russian surface-to-air missile/anti-ballistic missile system
 S500, several Mercedes-Benz S-Class car models
 Acer CloudMobile S500, a 2012 mobile phone model
 BenQ S500, a 2005 mobile phone
 Canon PowerShot S500, a camera
 Fengxing S500, a car
 Honda S500, a 1963 car
 S500, a Nikon Coolpix series camera
 Sony Cyber-shot DSC-S500, a camera
 Sony Ericsson S500, a 2007 mobile phone model
 Yamaha PSR-S500, a portable music keyboard

See also